Andrew Antonie McFarlane (born 30 November 1966) is an English retired footballer who played as a striker. Whilst at Swansea he was a part of the team that won after a penalty shootout in the 1994 Football League Trophy Final.

References

External links

1966 births
Living people
Association football forwards
Footballers from Wolverhampton
English footballers
Cradley Town F.C. players
Portsmouth F.C. players
Swansea City A.F.C. players
Scunthorpe United F.C. players
Torquay United F.C. players
English Football League players